Zaragoza Municipality may refer to:
 Zaragoza Municipality, Antioquia, Colombia
 Zaragoza Municipality, Coahuila, Mexico
 Zaragoza Municipality, Puebla, Mexico
 Zaragoza Municipality, San Luis Potosí, Mexico
 Zaragoza Municipality, Veracruz, Mexico
 Zaragoza Municipality, El Salvador
 Zaragoza Municipality, Guatemala

Municipality name disambiguation pages